The 1990 Los Angeles Raiders season was the franchise's 31st season overall, and the franchise's 21st season in the National Football League. Led by Coach of the Year Art Shell, the club appeared in its first AFC Championship Game since their Super Bowl-winning 1983 season, but lost a lopsided affair to the Buffalo Bills, 51-3. This would be the Raiders' final division title for 10 years, and their final one in Los Angeles.

Offseason

NFL draft

Staff

Roster

Starters

Regular season

Schedule

Game summaries

Week 1

    
    
    
    
    

On opening day the Raiders achieved an important victory but they did not score an offensive touchdown.  At halftime the Broncos led Los Angeles 6–0.  During the third quarter, Denver quarterback John Elway was intercepted by Raider lineback Jerry Robinson and the veteran returned the ball to the endzone for a touchdown.  Later, cornerback Terry McDaniel scored the first touchdown of his career on a 42-yard fumble return.  Leading 14–6 the Raiders defense held firm and only surrendered a third field goal to Denver.

Week 2

    
    
    
    
    
    

The Raiders won their second straight game to start the 1990 season with a 2–0 record.  A defensive struggle ensued between the two teams and by the end of the third quarter the Seahawks led 10–3.  Raiders starting quarterback Jay Schroeder tied the game with a 12-yard scoring strike to wide receiver Mervyn Fernandez.  Seattle regained the lead a few moments later on a 19-yard field goal.  With time running short the Raiders drove downfield and scored on a 1-yard run by reserve running back Greg Bell to earn the victory.

Week 3

    
    
    
    
    

The Raider defense combined for six sacks to beat Pittsburgh.  The Steelers took a 3–0 lead but the Raiders scored 20 straight points to rout Pittsburgh.

Week 4

    
    
    
    
    
    

Marcus Allen scored the first points of the game, a 1-yard touchdown run, and the Raiders never looked back.  Another Allen touchdown and a short fumble return for a touchdown by Greg Townsend rounded out the scoring.  Willie Gault beat up his former team with 103 yards receiving on just 4 receptions.

Week 5

Week 6 

    
    
    
    
    
    
    

Following fan-related violence in the stands during the Raiders' previous two home games, including an incident during the game against Pittsburgh that left a Steelers fan in intensive care and with long term injuries, no alcohol was sold to fans during this game. Alcohol sales would resume at the next home game, but with tighter restrictions.

Week 7

    
    
    
    
    
    
    

The Raiders rewarded Bo Jackson's return from professional baseball by giving him the ball 12 times for 53 yards and 2 touchdowns.  On defense, the Raiders recorded two sacks and held the Chargers to just three field goals.

Week 9

The Raiders scored the only touchdown of the game but the Chiefs outscored and outrushed the Raiders to hand the Raiders their second loss of the season.

Week 10

The Packers overcame 8 sacks by the Raiders to force four Raider turnovers and bask in the glory of 10 Raiders penalties.

Week 11

    
    
    
    
    

On Monday Night Football both Marcus Allen and Bo Jackson rushed for 79 yards and 99 yards respectively to beat Miami and rebound for consecutive losses to Kansas City and Green Bay.  Marcus Allen scored the only Raider touchdown of the game.

Week 12

  
The Raiders lost their fourth game of the 1990 season and their third defeat in four weeks.  Marcus Allen scored three times and both Allen and Jackson combined for over 100 yards rushing but it was not enough.  Chiefs quarterback Steve DeBerg threw three touchdown passes and the Chiefs defense combined for five sacks to earn a season sweep of Los Angeles.

Week 13

    
    
    
    
    
    
    
    

Bo Jackson had been fairly quiet all season until a dose of Denver defense cured him of any of his struggles.  During the third quarter and with the Raiders leading 14–13, Bo Jackson broke several tackles during a 62-yard touchdown run.  The score was Jackson's second touchdown of the afternoon and the former Auburn star rushed 13 times for 117 yards.  Receiver Willie Gault helped out with 9 receptions for 99 yards.

Week 14

    
    
    
    
    
    
    
    
    
    
    

For the second time in four weeks the Raiders played on Monday Night Football.  The game's biggest prime time stage contained some of the greatest college football players in history.  The teams set an NFL record with five combined Heisman Trophy winners taking the field. (For the Raiders it was Marcus Allen, Bo Jackson and Tim Brown.  For the Lions it was Barry Sanders and Andre Ware.)  The game turned out to be a shootout with Allen, Brown, Jackson and Barry Sanders scoring touchdowns.  Sanders rushed for 176 yards on 25 carries and Jackson carried 18 times for 129 yards.  The Raiders defense captured four sacks and an interception to earn their ninth win of the season.

Week 15

    
    
    
    
    

During the game Bo Jackson rushed eight times for 117 yards and Tim Brown scored twice.  After trailing 7–0 the Raiders scored 24 unanswered points to crush Cincinnati.

Week 16

    
    
    
    
    
    
    
    

Jay Schroeder gave Los Angeles a 14–0 lead after hitting receivers Sam Graddy and Mervyn Fernandez with touchdown passes. The Vikings reentered the game with 10 unanswered points but Schroeder threw two more touchdown passes to Marcus Allen and Ethan Horton to give Los Angeles a 28–10 lead.  Future Raider quarterback Rich Gannon replaced Vikings starter and future Raider Wade Wilson and threw two touchdown passes to earn the final points of the contest.  The Raiders defense came through again with five sacks and an interception.

Week 17

    
    
    
    
    
    

The two losses to Kansas City hurt the Raiders here but hopes of a divisional championship were still alive.  With a win the Raiders would win the AFC West and the team did not disappoint.  Trailing 12–10 in the fourth quarter, the Raiders mounted an important drive and fullback Steve Smith finalized the win with a short touchdown reception from Jay Schroeder.

Standings

Playoffs

Divisional

    
    
    
    
    
    

The Raiders recorded 235 rushing yards (with 140 of them coming from running back Marcus Allen), while holding the Bengals to just 182 total yards and sacking Boomer Esiason four times (three by lineman Greg Townsend), but still had to score 10 unanswered points in the fourth quarter to clinch the victory. The Bengals scored first during the second period with kicker Jim Breech's 27-yard field goal. But Los Angeles quarterback Jay Schroeder threw a 13-yard touchdown pass to wide receiver Mervyn Fernandez to give the Raiders a 7–3 lead before halftime. Los Angeles kicker Jeff Jaeger made a 49-field goal in the third quarter, but Cincinnati tied the game early in the fourth period with running back Stanford Jennings' 8-yard touchdown reception from Esiason. However, a 41-yard touchdown pass from Schroeder to tight end Ethan Horton and Jaeger's 25-yard field goal clinched the victory.

This was Raiders running back Bo Jackson's final NFL game, having injured his left hip during the third quarter while being tackled from behind by Bengals linebacker Kevin Walker. The injury was later revealed to have caused a degenerative bone condition in Jackson's hip called avascular necrosis. Before being knocked out of the game, he rushed 6 times for 77 yards. Some Bengals fans theorize that this injury to one of the greatest athletes ever placed a curse on the Bengals franchise (sometimes called "the curse of Bo Jackson"), and that this curse is partially responsible for the Bengals' notorious failure to field a competitive football team for most of the next decade and half, and would not win their next playoff game until the 2021 season, coincidentally against the Raiders.

This game is also notable for being Marcus Allen's last 100-plus yard rushing performance with the Raiders, as well as the last postseason game the Bengals would play in until the 2005 season.

Conference Championship

Raiders head coach Art Shell became the first African-American coach to take his team to a conference championship game, but the results were not in his favor.

The Bills shredded the Raiders, limiting quarterback Jay Schroeder to 13 of 31 completions for 150 yards and intercepting him 5 times, while also holding running back Marcus Allen to just 26 yards on 10 carries. On offense, the Bills amassed 502 total yards, including 202 yards on the ground.  Running back Thurman Thomas rushed for 138 and a touchdown while also catching 5 passes for 61 yards, while running back Kenneth Davis tied an AFC playoff record with 3 rushing touchdowns. Buffalo also set an NFL playoff record by scoring 41 points in the first half. Bills quarterback Jim Kelly threw for 300 yards and two touchdown passes to wide receiver James Lofton, who finished the game with 5 receptions for 113 yards. Thomas recorded a 12-yard touchdown run, while Davis scored from 1 yard, 3 yards, and 1 yard out. Linebacker Darryl Talley returned one of his two interceptions 27 yards for a touchdown.

On Buffalo's opening drive, Kelly completed six consecutive passes, the last one a 13-yard touchdown throw to Lofton after he recovered a fumbled snap in shotgun formation. The Raiders responded with a 41-yard field goal from Jeff Jaeger, but Buffalo stormed back with another touchdown just four plays after the ensuing kickoff, set up by Kelly's 41-yard completion to Lofton. After a punt, Los Angeles defensive back Gary Lewis intercepted a pass from Kelly.  But two plays later, Talley intercepted a pass from Schroeder and returned it for a touchdown.  The Raiders were forced to punt on their next possession, and Buffalo stormed down the field again, scoring with a 1-yard touchdown run by Davis on fourth down and goal. An interception by Nate Odomes set up Davis' second touchdown less than a minute later, and before the half ended, Lofton caught his second touchdown pass to give the Bills a 41–3 first half lead.

Buffalo increased their lead to 48–3 with Davis' third touchdown on the first play of the fourth quarter. Later on, Scott Norwood closed out the scoring with a 39-yard field goal.

Buffalo recorded a total of six interceptions, the third highest total ever in a single NFL game.  Defensive back Mark Kelso recorded his fourth career postseason interception in the game, a Bills' record.

Awards and records
Art Shell, NFL Coach of the Year
Bo Jackson, Pro Bowl
Greg Townsend, Pro Bowl
Marcus Allen, 13 total touchdowns, 12 rushing and 1 receiving

References

External links
 1990 Los Angeles Raiders at Pro-Football-Reference.com

Los Angeles Raiders
1990
AFC West championship seasons
Los